Udea despecta, the Hawaiian sweetpotato leafroller, is a moth of the family Crambidae. It is endemic to the Hawaiian islands of Kauai, Oahu, Molokai, Maui, Lanai and Hawaii.

The larvae feed on Adenostomma viscosus, Bidens species (including Bidens cosmoides), Ipomoea species, Lipochaeta calycosa and sweet potato. They roll the leaves of their host plant. It is a minor pest on sweet potato.

External links

Moths described in 1877
Endemic moths of Hawaii
despecta